Ivor Hael Thomas (1875 – 21 December 1963) was a British trade unionist and socialist activist.

Born in Briton Ferry, Thomas worked in the office of a tinplate works from the age of fifteen, then became a tinplate finisher.  He joined the Dock, Wharf, Riverside and General Labourers' Union, and served on its executive from 1914 until 1916.  He was a member of the Independent Labour Party (ILP) for many years, and served on its National Administrative Committee, representing the Wales Division, from 1914 until 1920.  About one in twenty residents of the town were members of the Briton Ferry ILP, and this has been credited largely to Thomas' enthusiasm.  Like the majority of the ILP, he opposed the war, and was personally prominent in the No Conscription Fellowship.  He arranged anti-war speakers from across the UK to visit Briton Ferry, with at least twenty anti-war meetings each year from 1916 until 1918.

In 1916, Thomas became the first Welsh organiser of the National Council for Civil Liberties (NCCL), although he was keen to stress that the NCCL as a whole did not oppose the war.  After the war, he became the first secretary of its Aberavon Constituency Labour Party, and began working full-time as an official of the Transport and General Workers' Union.

References

1875 births
1963 deaths
Independent Labour Party National Administrative Committee members
People from Briton Ferry
Welsh trade unionists